Wilhelm Schulthess (18 May 1855 in Villnachern – 6 March 1917 in Zürich) was a Swiss internist and pediatrician, known for his work in the field of orthopedics. He was the brother of politician Edmund Schulthess (1868–1944).

In 1883, with August Lüning (1852–1925), he opened a private orthopedic institute in Zürich. In 1889 he obtained his habilitation, and in 1912 became an associate professor at the University of Zürich.

In 1908 he was appointed president of the Deutschen Gesellschaft für Orthopädische Chirurgie (German Society of Orthopedic Surgery). He was instrumental towards the founding of the Schweizerischen Vereins für krüppelhafte Kinder (Swiss Association for Crippled Children; 1909).

He specialized in research of scoliosis, of which, he developed methods for measuring and recording the degree and the different types of the disorder.

Selected works 
 Ein neuer Mess- und Zeichnungsapparat für Rückgratsverkrümmungen, 1887 – A new measurement and marking apparatus for spinal deformities.
 Klinische Studien über das Verhalten der physiologischen Krümmungen der Wirbelsäule bei Skoliose, 1889 – Clinical studies on the behavior of physiological curves of the spine in scoliosis.
 Messung und Röntgen'sche Photographie in der Diagnostik der Skoliose (with August Lüning, 1897/98) – Measurement and x-ray photography in the diagnostics of scoliosis.
 Die Krüppelfürsorge, 1912 – On the welfare of cripples.
 Die Pathologie und Therapie der Rückgratsverkrümmungen – Pathology and therapy for curvature of the spine.
 Die Anstalt Balgrist, Schweizerische Heil- und Erziehungsanstalt für krüppelhafte Kinder und orthopädische Poliklinik, 1914.

References 

1855 births
1917 deaths
People from Brugg District
Swiss Calvinist and Reformed Christians
Swiss orthopedic surgeons
Swiss pediatricians
Academic staff of the University of Zurich